The Hussar Ballad is a 1962 Soviet musical film by Eldar Ryazanov, filmed on Mosfilm. In effect, it is one of the best loved musical comedies in Russia.

With most of its dialogue delivered in verse, Ryazanov's script romanticizes the adventures of Nadezhda Durova during the Napoleonic wars. The swift paced, action packed, humor filled adventure is ingeniously mixed with light-hearted acting bravado and memorable operetta pieces. The film's musical score and songs were written by Tikhon Khrennikov.

The leading roles — those of the cavalry maiden Shurochka Azarova and the dashing hussar Poruchik Dmitry Rzhevsky — were played by Andrei Mironov's future wife Larisa Golubkina and the People's Artist of the USSR Yuri Yakovlev, respectively. Comedian Igor Ilyinsky appeared as one-eyed Field-Marshal Prince Mikhail Kutuzov.

The film is based on the play A Long Time Ago by Alexander Gladkov.

The film proved so popular with Soviet audiences that poruchik Rzhevsky became quite a folklore character, featured in numerous jokes. See Russian jokes#Poruchik Rzhevsky for samples.

Cast
Larisa Golubkina as Shura Azarova
Yury Yakovlev as Poruchik Dmitry Rzhevsky
Igor Ilyinsky as Field-Marshal Kutuzov
Nikolai Kryuchkov as Ivan
Viktor Koltsov as Major Azarov
Antoni Khodursky as Count Nurin
Tatyana Shmyga as Louise Germont
Lev Polyakov as Pelymov
Yuri Belov as hussar-partisan

Interesting facts 
 The director was planning to take Alisa Freindlich for the leading role. She was even auditioned several times for the role. No one doubted that she would get the role. However, at the last moment, Larisa Golubkina, who was not known to anyone yet, was confirmed for the role of Shurochka. It was her debut in the movie.
 Before Freindlich, Lyudmila Gurchenko, Valentina Malyavina, Tatyana Nikulina and Svetlana Nemolyaeva were auditioned for the role of Shurochka.
 The film was made especially for the 150th anniversary of the Battle of Borodino. The premiere of the film was held September 7, 1962, the day of the battle, in the Moscow cinema "Russia".
 A small part of the costumes, made for the film "War and Peace" was used during the filming.
 Sergei Yursky and Vyacheslav Tikhonov were first auditioned for the role of Lieutenant Rzhevsky.

References

External links

1962 films
1960s historical comedy films
1962 musical comedy films
Soviet historical comedy films
Russian historical comedy films
Soviet musical comedy films
Russian musical comedy films
1960s Russian-language films
Films directed by Eldar Ryazanov
Napoleonic Wars films
Films about female wartime cross-dressers
Mosfilm films
1960s historical musical films
Soviet historical musical films
Films scored by Tikhon Khrennikov